Tawe-Uchaf is a community in Powys, Wales. Situated north-east of Ystradgynlais in the upper valley of the River Tawe (hence the name), it includes the villages of Caehopkin, Coelbren, Glyntawe, Pen-y-cae, Penwyllt and Ynyswen. It had a population in 2001 of 1,516, increasing at the 2011 Census to 1,562.

There are many caves in the area, the most famous of them being Dan-yr-Ogof, one of the largest cave systems in western Europe and a popular attraction for visitors.

A part of Tawe-Uchaf lies within Fforest Fawr Geopark and the Brecon Beacons National Park.

A complex of Bronze Age monuments known as Cerrig Duon (the "black rocks") – consisting of a stone circle, avenue, and three-stone row – and Maen Mawr (the "great stone") can be seen near the source of the Tawe at the northern end of the community area.

Tawe-Uchaf is also home to Craig-y-Nos Castle, a country house built in 1841 and subsequently purchased and much extended by the renowned operatic singer Adelina Patti.

Opencast coal mining is an important activity in the area.

Governance
The Tawe Uchaf Community Council has thirteen community councillors representing three community wards: Ynyswen Penycae, Caehopkin and Coelbren. The council represents the community on planning issues and other matters.

An electoral ward in the same name exists, sending a county councillor to sit on Powys County Council. This ward includes Ystradfellte and at the 2011 Census had a population of 2,118.

References

External links 
 Tawe Uchaf Community Council website
 Brecon Beacons National Park
 Cwmtawe Uchaf Parish Community (Church in Wales)
 Fforest Fawr Geopark

Brecknockshire
Communities in Powys
Wards of Powys